Pastorius may refer to:

People
Francis Daniel Pastorius (1651–c. 1720), leader of the first organized settlement of Germans in Pennsylvania
Francis D. Pastorius (1920–1962), American lawyer and politician
Jaco Pastorius (1951–1987), American jazz bassist and composer
Jaco Pastorius (album), a 1976 album
Jim Pastorius (1881–1941), American professional baseball player

Other
Operation Pastorius, a failed sabotage attack by Nazi Germany on the United States in 1942
Pastorius Park, a park  in the Chestnut Hill neighborhood of Northwest Philadelphia, United States, named after Francis Daniel Pastorius
Pastorius Brand, a knitted brand sweater company based in Buenos Aires, Argentina

See also
Pistorius, a surname

Surnames of German origin